The 1987–88 Southwest Missouri State Bears basketball team represented Southwest Missouri State University in National Collegiate Athletic Association (NCAA) Division I men's basketball during the 1987–88 season. Playing in the Summit League (AMCU-8) and led by head coach Charlie Spoonhour, the Bears finished the season with a 22–7 overall record and won the AMCU-8 regular season title. Southwest Missouri State lost to UNLV in the opening round of the NCAA tournament.

Roster

Schedule and results

|-
!colspan=9 style=| Exhibition

|-
!colspan=9 style=| Non-Conference Regular Season

|-
!colspan=9 style=| AMCU-8 Regular Season

|-
!colspan=10 style=| NCAA Tournament

References

Missouri State Bears basketball seasons
Southwest Missouri State
Missouri State Bears Basketball Team
Missouri State Bears Basketball Team
Southwest Missouri State